Kasson S. Gibson was president of the Optical Society of America from 1939-40.

See also
Optical Society of America#Past Presidents of the OSA

References

External links
 Articles Published by early OSA Presidents Journal of the Optical Society of America

Presidents of Optica (society)
American physicists
1979 deaths
Year of birth missing